El Kazovsky (July 13, 1948 – July 21, 2008) was a Russian-born Hungarian painter, performer, poet and costume designer; one of the leading Hungarian painters of his time.

Personal life

El Kazovsky was born under the name of Elena Kazovskaya in Leningrad, Russia to Irina Putolova, an art historian, and Yefim Kazovsky, a physicist.  He moved to Hungary in 1965, at the age of 15, and graduated in 1977 with a degree in painting from the Hungarian Academy of Fine Arts. El Kazovsky's masters were György Kádár and Ignác Kokas.

El Kazovsky was open about being transgender - born biologically as a female and self-defining as an androphile man.

Art

His art cannot be broken down into periods; all of his expressive paintings reveal the same mythological world that he created. Several recurring figures appear in many of his paintings, such as the long nosed dog or the ballet dancer figure. Besides paintings, his work includes stage designs, performances and installations.

Awards
 Kossuth Award (2002)
 Mihaly Munkacsy Award (1989)
 Gyula Derkovits Scholarship (1980)

Exhibitions

Solo shows:
 El Kazovsky: Encore—Várfok Gallery, Budapest, 2016
 The State Russian Museum—Marble Palace, St. Petersburg, 2005

Group shows:
 Mis-en Abyme (Kép a képben)—Várfok Gallery, Budapest, 2008
 Hungarian Art. Danubiana—Meulensteen Art Museum, Bratislava, 2007
 Re:embrandt—Contemporary Hungarian Artists Respond. Museum of Fine Arts - Budapest, Budapest, 2006
 Common Space—Ernst Museum Budapest, Budapest, 2006
 In Black and White—Graphic Art exhibition. Műcsarnok / Kunsthalle Budapest, 2001
 Millennial serie of exhibitions in the Mucsarnok—Mucsarnok Kunsthalle, Budapest, 2000

Public collections
 Hungarian National Gallery (Magyar Nemzeti Galéria), Budapest, Hungary
 Ludwig Museum - Museum of Contemporary Art, Budapest, Hungary
 Institute of Contemporary Art, Dunaújváros, Hungary
 Muzeum Sztuki w Lodz, Lodz, Poland

Books, monographies
 Forgacs, Eva: El Kazovszkij (monograph, 1996)
 Uhl, Gabriella: El Kazovszkij kegyetlen testszínháza (album, 2008)

References

1950 births
2008 deaths
Hungarian LGBT painters
Russian LGBT painters
Transgender painters
Transgender men
Hungarian University of Fine Arts alumni
20th-century Hungarian painters
20th-century Russian LGBT people
20th-century Hungarian LGBT people